TransLattice is a software company based in Santa Clara, California.  It geographically distributes databases and applications for enterprise, cloud and hybrid environments. TransLattice offers a NewSQL database and an application platform.

History 
TransLattice was founded in 2007 and officially launched in 2010.  The company co-founders are Frank Huerta, CEO, Mike Lyle, Executive VP of Engineering and Robert Geiger, who previously worked together at Recourse Technologies. TransLattice is based in Santa Clara, California.

In August 2008 the company received $9.5 million in series A funding from DCM, an early stage capital venture funding company.

In 2013, TransLattice acquired StormDB, a database-as-a-service startup. StormDB's clustered PostgreSQL fork was open sourced in 2014 under the name Postgres-XL.

Technology
TransLattice specializes in distributed databases and application platforms for enterprise and cloud IT systems.  The company has developed a geographically-distributed computing-architecture that allows a single database to run on multiple nodes located anywhere.

The TransLattice Elastic Database (TED), a NewSQL database management system, enables the building of a "highly available, fault tolerant data fabric  multiple nodes that can be located anywhere in the world".  The TransLattice database is fully SQL/ACID-compliant.  TED operates as "a cohesive, single database".

TransLattice provided the world's first geographically-distributed relational database management system (RDBMS) to deploy on multiple public-cloud-provider networks at the same time, as well as on virtual machines, physical hardware or any combination thereof.

References

Database companies
Software companies based in California
Companies based in Santa Clara, California
Software companies of the United States